Joseph Allister Price (4 July 1886 – 16 April 1986) was an Australian rules footballer who played with Richmond in the Victorian Football League (VFL).

Notes

External links 

1886 births
1986 deaths
Australian rules footballers from Victoria (Australia)
Richmond Football Club players
People from Traralgon